Kunshan  is a county-level city in southeastern Jiangsu province with Shanghai  bordering its eastern border and Suzhou on its western boundary. It is under the administration of the prefecture-level city of Suzhou.

Name
There is a strong possibility that the name Kunshan is derived from a hill, but which one is controversial. According to an impacted version, the hill is present-day Little Kunshan (Xiaokunshan) in Shanghai's Songjiang District. The character  (Kun) was the old Chinese name for the Kunlun Mountains. From it developed the Chinese idiom "a jade from Kunlun Mountains", meaning any "outstanding figure". This was applied to Lu Ji and a hill in his hometown was designated as Kun to commemorate him.

History 

Lou county which administered Kunshan and the area around was established in Qin dynasty. It was named after Lou River, while its seat was located in the north eastern of Kunshan. In 507, Xinyi county which hold Lou county 's former seat was separated from the old Lou county. In 535, the old Kunshan county was separated from the old Xinyi county, while its seat was moved to the north of Kun Hill, Songjiang. In 751, the seat was moved to the south of Ma'anshan (in Kunshan nowadays).
In 1724, then Kunshan county was divided into new Kunshan county and Xinyang county, the walled city also was halved to locate their own seat respectively. In 1860, Taiping Rebellions captured the walled city, then the Ever Victorious Army recaptured it in 1863.
On 11 November 1911, the local rally announced that both of the counties seceded from the Qing court from then on. In 1912, Xinyang county was merged into Kunshan county. On 15 November 1937, the Japanese army captured the walled city. On 13 May 1949, the CPC controlled the walled city. On 28 September 1989, the county was turn into a county-level city.

Administration 
Kunshan is divided into several towns and development areas:

 Yushan (the seat of city nominally)
 Bacheng
 Dianshanhu
 Huaqiao
 Jinxi 
 Lujia 
 Qiandeng
 Penglang
 Zhangpu
 Zhoushi
 Zhouzhuang 

Kunshan New & Hi-tech Industrial Development Zone (KSND) administering the main part of Yushan functions as the seat of the city, while Huaqiao Economic Development Zone administers the north of Huaqiao and Kunshan Economic & Technological Development Zone (KETD) administers the east of Yushan.

On July 10, 2018, the Jiangsu Provincial Government approved the Master Plan of Kunshan for Urban Development (2017-2035), which is based on the master plan of the Xiong’an New Area. These zones include the Qingyang Port Waterfront City Center, the Duke Creative Park, the Kunshan South Gateway, the Chaoyang Road CBD and the Tinglin Park Traditional Culture Zone—in addition to the S1 Rail Line Corridor.

Qingyang Port Waterfront City Center

Covering an area of 3.4 sq km, the area is located in Kunshan’s city center. Planned as an ecological, cultural and smart area, it will include six zones—a media port, a cultural oasis, an urban lifestyle community, a waterfront park, a futuristic life experience center, and a youth entrepreneurship park. The area is designed to be a waterfront space that will enrich and diversify citizens’ urban life as the most environmentally attractive and economically prosperous hub in the city.

Duke Creative Park

The park is located west of the city’s technology innovation cluster, covering an area of 3.84 sq km. It sits nearby three lakes, two industrial parks, and a town. With the support of Duke Kunshan University, the area will host the Sino-US (Kunshan) Technology Innovation Center and serve as a mixed-used project integrating R&D centers, business services, and an ecological park. It aims to become a global magnet for technology entrepreneurs and innovators.

Kunshan South Gateway

The area is located around the city’s high-speed railway station, with an area of 1.6 sq km. While serving as a transportation hub integrating high-speed trains, rail transportation, and public buses, the area will develop businesses such as office spaces for lease, business services and recruitment agencies. As an open, innovative modern gateway, the area will become an important business cluster in the inter-city economic belt of Shanghai and Nanjing.

Chaoyang Road CBD

The CBD covers an area of 5.55 sq km in the old city center of Kunshan. The area will be furnished with enhanced amenities and infrastructure according to a plan featuring “one ring, two axes, three centers and four zones”. The project aims to revive and transform the old city center into an exquisite and livable model business district.

Tinglin Park Traditional Culture Zone

The zone is located at the foot of Yufeng Mountain, with a planned area of 0.73 sq km. It is designed with cultural and art parks, culture-oriented businesses and ecological and leisure facilities. It will epitomize the natural beauty and cultural richness of the city.

S1 Rail Line Corridor

The line is 41 km long and will be completely constructed underground with 28 stops. The line will pass by all the major zones of the city and will significantly alleviate local traffic congestion. The project will be integrated with the surface transportation system and serve as a strong boost to the city’s renewal.

Geography

Topography 
The area is relatively flat, but there is a gentle slope stretching from the south-east to north-west. The northern part consists of dense polder, while the southern part is dotted with various lakes. The major lakes are Dianshan Lake, Yangcheng Lake, Cheng Lake and Kuilei Lake. The Wusong River winds through the city, while smaller rivers criss-cross it in a grid pattern.

Climate

According to an analysis of the local meteorological bureau, from 1961 to 2008, the annual and seasonal air temperatures were the increasing trends, especially in spring. The total precipitation remained static relatively, however, much concentrated in summer and winter.

Economy

The composition of local GDP have changed drastically since 1978. In 1978, the primary sector, the secondary sector and the tertiary sector accounted for 51.4%, 28.9% and 19.7% of Kunshan's GDP, respectively. However, in 2015, the primary sector only accounted for 0.9% of Kunshan's GDP, while the secondary sector accounted for 55.1% and the tertiary sector accounted for 44.0%. Kunshan is also home to over 1,000 hi-tech companies that have helped shape the city’s four economic pillars—optoelectronics, semiconductors, intelligent manufacturing, and RNAi and biomedicine.

The total GDP of Kunshan was 316 billion RMB, the highest of any Chinese county-level city in 2016.

Kunshan is also home to many Taiwanese who have invested over the decades since China's opening up to the world in the late 70s. Kunshan is also known as "Little Taiwan" because of the large Taiwanese community there. In 2020, there were more than 100,000 Taiwanese people in Kunshan.

The Chinese subsidiary of American Megatrends, American Megatrends Information Technology (Kunshan) Co., Ltd. (安迈信息科技（昆山）有限公司), has its headquarters in Kunshan.

Culture

Kunqu Opera 
Kunshan is the origin of Kunqu, also known as Kunqu opera. Kunqu is one of the oldest extant forms of Chinese opera. It evolved from the local melody of Kunshan, and subsequently came to dominate Chinese theater from the 16th to the 18th centuries. Today, Kunqu is performed in many cities in China.

Kunshan Culture & Art Center 
Kunshan Culture & Art Center, situated west of downtown, is usually used as the venue for considerable local performances and conventions.  The center is composed of a performing arts center, a convention center, a movie theater.  Its first phase of the project is set in about 17.6 acres of land.

Cuisine 
Kunshan is known for its Yangcheng Lake hairy crabs, which are prized for their sweet flesh and fatty roe. Yangcheng Lake, famous for its hairy crabs, is located in Kunshan.

Recreation and tourism 
Kunshan is one of the most visited tourist destinations among the Yangtze River Delta with over 20 million visits in 2016.

The 2013 World Cyber Games were held in Kunshan in order to draw in tourism and positive press.

Education

There are two institutions in Kunshan issuing at least bachelor's degree:
 Duke Kunshan University
 Applied Technology College of Soochow University

The city also hosts a variety of primary and secondary schools, both public and private:

 Canadian International School Kunshan
 Kunshan Middle School 
 Kunshan West High School

Transportation

Road

Expressways 
 G2 Beijing–Shanghai Expressway
 G1501 Shanghai Ring Expressway
 S5 Changshu–Jiaxing Expressway
 S48 Shanghai–Yixing Expressway
 S58 Shanghai–Changzhou Expressway

National Highway 
 China National Highway 312

Railway
 Kunshan Railway Station is a railway station on Jinghu Railway situated in the south of the downtown. It principally handles freight.
Kunshan South Railway Station is a junction where Beijing-Shanghai High-Speed Railway and Shanghai–Nanjing Intercity High-Speed Railway link at. Besides, both Yangcheng Lake Railway Station and Huaqiao Railway Station are on the Shanghai–Nanjing Intercity High-Speed Railway.

Metro
A plan made to construct two metro lines running through the city center was approved by the Jiangsu provincial government. Kunshan is the first county-level city with a metro line. Line 11, Shanghai Metro has been extended to Huaqiao, Kunshan in 2013.  Line S1 of Suzhou Rail Transit to Kunshan is under construction.

Notable people

 Gui Youguang
 Gu Yanwu
 Gong Xian
 Ding Shande
 Fei Junlong
 Zhang Xinyu
 Li Qin
 Qian Qihu
 Zhang Kejian

Literature
 Einar Tangen: Cities of China – Kunshan. The Kunshan Way. Beijing: Foreign Languages Press, 2010; .

References

Citations

Sources

External links 

City of Kunshan
City of Kunshan 
Kunshan City English guide (Jiangsu.NET)
Kunshan City Guide
Kunshan Leaps to the Head of China's Top 10 Richest Counties